Seol Ki-hyeon (Korean: 설기현; Hanja: 薛琦鉉 ; born 8 January 1979) is a South Korean former professional footballer who played as a winger, and who currently is the manager of Gyeongnam FC. He is also the first South Korean footballer to score in the history of the UEFA Champions League, during his time at Anderlecht.

Club career

Career in Belgium 
In July 2000, Seol joined a Belgian club Royal Antwerp. He became the second South Korean footballer to score in double figures during a season in Europe, following Cha Bum-kun. After a successful season with Royal Antwerp, Seol moved to Anderlecht in the same league. He scored a hat-trick in the space of 12 minutes in the 2001 Belgian Super Cup. He also became the first South Korean player to score in the qualifying round of the UEFA Champions League. He won the 2003–04 Belgian First Division with Anderlecht.

Wolverhampton Wanderers 
In August 2004, Seol moved to England, joining a Championship club Wolverhampton Wanderers. The Wolverhampton manager at the time, Glenn Hoddle, preferred Seol as one of his first-choice forwards, using him in various roles such as striker, attacking midfielder and winger.

Disappointed by the failure of Wolves' promotion, Seol sought Premier League clubs interested in him before the 2006 FIFA World Cup despite having two years left on his contract. He was reported as saying "At this stage, I'm frustrated not to be in the Premiership. I think there will be some good news after the World Cup."

Reading
Seol eventually joined newly promoted Premier League club Reading on 12 July 2006 for a reported transfer fee of £1.5 million. He was voted the Reading Player of the Month for August by fans after showing great performances early in the season. On 16 September 2006, he scored his first Premiership goal in a 2–1 win over Sheffield United. On 1 October 2006, he scored his second goal for Reading in a 1–0 win over West Ham United. His third goal for Reading, his first at home, came on 18 November 2006 in the 2–0 win against Charlton Athletic. However, his performance was not consistently kept during the rest of the season. He scored his fourth goal in the last game of the season against Blackburn Rovers.

Fulham
Seol left Reading for Fulham on 31 August 2007 for an undisclosed fee on a three-year contract, with Liam Rosenior going the other way. Reading boss Steve Coppell admitted that strained relations between him and Seol led to the move.

After his manager Lawrie Sanchez was replaced by Roy Hodgson, Seol wasn't chosen as Hodgson's player during the rest of the season. He scored his first goal for Fulham in a 2–1 defeat to Hull City on 16 August 2008, but he still didn't show something special the next season. On 14 January 2009, he signed an initial six-month loan move to Al-Hilal in Saudi Arabia with a view to moving permanently. However, he stated that he desired to stay at Fulham to win his place in the squad at the end of his loan deal.

Seol scored his second goal for the club in a Europa League qualifier against FK Vėtra on 30 July 2009, but he failed to made a twist for his status. On 15 January 2010, It was announced that his contract with Fulham was cancelled by mutual consent.

Retirement
Seol played for Pohang Steelers, Ulsan Hyundai, and Incheon United in the K League after leaving Fulham. During his K League career, he was criticised for having no respect for clubs and lying to fans. He announced his retirement on 2 March 2015 in order to become the interim manager of Sungkyunkwan University. His retirement ceremony took place in a friendly match between South Korea and Jamaica on 13 October 2015.

International career
Seol was a participant in 2002 and 2006 FIFA World Cup. In the 2002 World Cup hosted by his country, he helped South Korea to reach the semi-finals as a starter. He also scored crucial equaliser in the round of 16 against Italy. He was nominated for the Ballon d'Or in that year.

Managerial career
On 26 December 2019, Seol was appointed as manager of Gyeongnam FC.

Media
Seol was sponsored by sportswear company Nike and appeared in Nike commercials. In a global Nike advertising campaign in the run-up to the 2002 World Cup in Korea and Japan, he starred in a "Secret Tournament" commercial (branded "Scopion KO") directed by Terry Gilliam, appearing alongside football players such as Thierry Henry, Ronaldo, Edgar Davids, Fabio Cannavaro, Francesco Totti, Ronaldinho, Luís Figo, and Hidetoshi Nakata, with former player Eric Cantona the tournament "referee".

Career statistics

Club

International

Results list South Korea's goal tally first.

Honours
Anderlecht
Belgian First Division: 2003–04
Belgian Super Cup: 2001

Al-Hilal
Saudi Crown Prince Cup: 2008–09

Ulsan Hyundai
Korean League Cup: 2011

South Korea U20
AFC Youth Championship: 1998

South Korea
FIFA World Cup fourth place: 2002
AFC Asian Cup third place: 2000

Individual
Korean FA Fans' Player of the Year: 2006

Notes

References

External links

 
 Seol Ki-hyeon – National Team Stats at KFA 
 
 
 Profile at alhilal.com
 
 

1979 births
Living people
Association football forwards
Association football wingers
South Korean footballers
South Korean expatriate footballers
South Korea international footballers
Royal Antwerp F.C. players
R.S.C. Anderlecht players
Wolverhampton Wanderers F.C. players
Reading F.C. players
Fulham F.C. players
Al Hilal SFC players
Pohang Steelers players
Ulsan Hyundai FC players
Incheon United FC players
Belgian Pro League players
English Football League players
Premier League players
K League 1 players
South Korean expatriate sportspeople in Belgium
South Korean expatriate sportspeople in the United Kingdom
South Korean expatriate sportspeople in Saudi Arabia
Expatriate footballers in Belgium
Expatriate footballers in England
South Korean expatriate sportspeople in England
Expatriate footballers in Saudi Arabia
2000 AFC Asian Cup players
2001 FIFA Confederations Cup players
2002 FIFA World Cup players
2004 AFC Asian Cup players
2006 FIFA World Cup players
Saudi Professional League players
South Korean Buddhists
People from Jeongseon County